Roy Campling (3 April 1892 – 21 April 1977) was an Australian cricketer. He played three first-class matches for New South Wales in 1922/23.

See also
 List of New South Wales representative cricketers

References

External links
 

1892 births
1977 deaths
Australian cricketers
New South Wales cricketers
Cricketers from Sydney